Orlando Ferreira (born 5 February 1953) is a Portuguese judoka. He competed in the men's middleweight event at the 1972 Summer Olympics.

References

1953 births
Living people
Portuguese male judoka
Olympic judoka of Portugal
Judoka at the 1972 Summer Olympics
Place of birth missing (living people)
20th-century Portuguese people